James Bell Hindson (15 July 1908 – 1950) was an English professional footballer who made over 100 appearances as a full back in the Football League for Fulham.

Career statistics

References 

1908 births
1950 deaths
Footballers from Sunderland
English footballers
Association football fullbacks
Hylton Colliery Welfare F.C. players
Sunderland A.F.C. players
Spennymoor United F.C. players
Fulham F.C. players
Middlesbrough F.C. players
English Football League players